The Rural Municipality of Kinistino No. 459 is a rural municipality (RM) in the Canadian province of Saskatchewan within Census Division No. 15 and  Division No. 5.

History 
The RM of Kinistino No. 459 incorporated as a rural municipality on December 11, 1911.

Geography

Communities and localities 
The following urban municipalities are surrounded by the RM.

Towns
 Kinistino

Villages
 Weldon

Localities
 Brockington
 Fort a la Corne
 North Star
 Pahonan
 Pine Bluff

A reserves of the James Smith First Nation is also surrounded by the RM.

Demographics 

Attractions 
 Kinistino District Pioneer Museum
 Fort a la Corne Provincial Forest
 Fort de la Corne

Government 
The RM of Kinistino No. 459 is governed by an elected municipal council and an appointed administrator that meets on the second Thursday of every month. The reeve of the RM is Vance Shmyr while its administrator is Jacquelynne Mann. The RM's office is located in Kinistino.

Transportation 
 Saskatchewan Highway 3
 Saskatchewan Highway 682
 Saskatchewan Highway 778
 Saskatchewan Highway 789
 Canadian National Railway
 Weldon Ferry

See also 
List of rural municipalities in Saskatchewan

References 

K

Division No. 15, Saskatchewan